South of Pago Pago is a 1940 American South Seas adventure film directed by Alfred E. Green and starring Victor McLaglen, Jon Hall and Frances Farmer.

Premise
In 1875 a group of adventurers meet in Singapore to look for pearls in the Pacific Islands: ship's Captain Bucko Larson, his First Mate Williams, Peg Legged Foster and bar girl and adventuress Ruby Taylor. They are guided by a Portuguese sailor Manuel Ferro who knows of virgin pearl beds off the island of Manoa, "south of Pago Pago". They arrive at the island, however when Ferro wants more than his agreed third of a share, Bucko throws him over the side to his doom.

Passing out gifts, the amiable Bucko recruits the native divers to obtain pearls. When there are not many suitable pearls in the shallow waters, Bucko directs the divers to dangerous waters that cause death and severe injuries through decompression sickness. He his initial success in getting them to continue their diving by providing them more gifts and alcoholic beverages, but Kehane, the chief's son place a taboo on any more deep water diving.

Ruby is desired by Kehane, so Bucko uses her to marry Kehane where they leave the island for a honeymoon enabling Bucko to force the divers into more dangerous work at gunpoint for Bucko's profit. Ruby genuinely falls for Kehane and has a crisis of conscience.

Cast

Production

Development
Producer Edward Small announced the project in 1938 with the stars to be Jon Hall and Sigrid Gurie, both of whom would be borrowed from Sam Goldwyn. Small had a deal with United Artists. Howard Emmett Rogers was working on the script. In August 1938 Small sent a unit under John Burch to film in second unit footage in American Samoa.

In March 1939 Small announced the film as part of his $5 million seven-film program for 1939–40. (The other movies would be Kit Carson, Two Years Before the Mast, Valentino, Quantrill, My Son, My Son and Food of the Gods. Small would end up only making a few of these.) For a time it seemed Clayton Moore might be cast instead of Hall. Filming was to begin on 1 September 1939. Tom Neal and Diane Lewis joined the cast. Filming was pushed back to 15 September so Small could borrow director Charles Vidor from Columbia.

Eventually Small decided to put Vidor on My Son, My Son instead, feeling he was better suited to that.

In February 1940 Victor McLaglen was signed to costar alongside Clayton Moore and Alfred Werker was signed to direct. Moore did not appear in the final film. Small borrowed Frances Farmer to play the female lead; Farmer had been fighting with Paramount over roles and it was reported that this would be her last film under her Paramount contract.

Rita Hayworth was discussed for the role of the lead native girl. Olympe Bradne ended up playing it.

Shooting
Filming eventually began 26 March 1940. Locations included Balboa Island, Newport Beach with underwater scenes shot at Santa Catalina. On 3 April it was reported that Werker had "retired as director" after an "argument over the script." He was replaced by Alfred E. Green. Green had directed Farmer in her last film, Ride a Crooked Mile and described her as a "different girl" on this one.

After completion of the film, Hall immediately went into Kit Carson for Small.

Reception
Reviews were poor. The New York Times listed it as among the worst films of the year.

References

External links

1940 films
1940s historical adventure films
United Artists films
American black-and-white films
Films set in Oceania
Films directed by Alfred E. Green
Films produced by Edward Small
Films set in 1875
American historical adventure films
Films scored by Edward Ward (composer)
1940s English-language films
1940s American films